The following is a list of all IFT-licensed over-the-air television stations broadcasting in the Mexican state of San Luis Potosí. There are 22 television stations in San Luis Potosí.

List of television stations

|-

|-

|-

|-

|-

|-

|-

|-

|-

|-

|-

|-

|-

|-

|-

|-

|-

|-

|-

|-

|-

|-

|-

References

Television stations in San Luis Potosí
San Luis Potosi